Buhler, Buehler, or Bühler is a surname.  The German noun Bühl means "hill".  Notable people with the surname include:

Buhler
 Carlos Buhler, American mountaineer
 Joe P. Buhler (born 1950), American mathematician
 Robert Buhler (1916–1989), Swiss artist (also Bühler) 
Bühler
Anton Bühler (1922–2013), Swiss equestrian
 Arnaud Bühler, Swiss football defender
 Beate Bühler, German beach volleyball player
 Curt F. Bühler, American librarian
 Erwin Ludwig Buhler, Former Vice-president of the Oberlandesgericht (State Constitutional Court), Karlsruhe, and awarded "The Great Cross of Merit" in 1973 for services rendered to the State of Baden-Wurttemberg and to Germany.
 Georg Bühler, German Indologist
 Josef Bühler (1904-1948), Nazi executed for war crimes
 Karl Bühler (1879-1963), German psychologist
 Manuel Bühler, Colombian-Swiss football player
 Philippe Bühler, German musician
 Rolf Dieter Buhler, Former chief lawyer for the city of Karlsruhe, Germany, and son of Erwin Ludwig Buhler.
 Urs Felix Bühler (* 1943), former President and CEO of the Bühler Group

Buehler
 Al Buehler, American track and cross-country coach 
 Betty Buehler, American film actress
 David Buehler, American football player
 George Buehler, American football player
 Ken Buehler (born 1919), American basketball player
 Markus J. Buehler, American materials scientist
 Rachel Buehler, American soccer player
 Randy Buehler, American businessman
 Walker Buehler (born 1994), American baseball player
 William Buehler Seabrook, American occultist, explorer, traveller, and journalist

German-language surnames
Russian Mennonite surnames